Brushstrokes in Flight is a 1984 sculpture by Roy Lichtenstein, installed at the John Glenn Columbus International Airport in Columbus, Ohio. It is part of the Brushstrokes series of artworks that includes several paintings and sculptures whose subject is the actions made with a house-painter's brush.

See also
 1984 in art

References

External links
 Lichtenstein Foundation website
 Lichtenstein Foundation website

1984 establishments in Ohio
1984 sculptures
Aluminum sculptures in Ohio
Public art in Columbus, Ohio
Sculptures by Roy Lichtenstein